
Year 644 (DCXLIV) was a leap year starting on Thursday (link will display the full calendar) of the Julian calendar. The denomination 644 for this year has been used since the early medieval period, when the Anno Domini calendar era became the prevalent method in Europe for naming years.

Events 
<onlyinclude>

By place

Asia 
 Emperor Taizong of the Tang Dynasty sends a Chinese expeditionary force, to invade and annex the Tarim Basin kingdom of Karasahr in Xinjiang, a vassal of the Western Turkic Khaganate. The oasis state is conquered, and Western Turks sent to assist Karasahr are defeated by the Tang forces.

 Zenkoji, a Buddhist temple and landmark spot in Nagano, Japan, officially built by Empress Kogyoku.

Britain 
 Oswine, son of the late king Osric of Deira, manages to establish himself as king of Deira (Northern England) despite armed objections from King Oswiu of Bernicia. His succession, probably the choice of the people of Deira, splits the Kingdom of Northumbria.

Byzantine Empire 
 Valentinus, Byzantine general, attempts to usurp the throne of his son-in-law Constans II. He appears at the gates of Constantinople with a contingent of Byzantine troops, and demands to be crowned emperor. His claim is rejected, and Valentinus is lynched by the populace.

Islamic Empire 
 November 3 – The second caliph Umar, dies of wounds inflicted by the Persian slave Abu Lu'lu'a Firuz at Medina. On his death bed he appoints a committee to determine his successor. They select Uthman ibn Affan, who becomes the third caliph of the Rashidun Caliphate.

Births 
 K'inich K'an Joy Chitam II, ruler of Palenque 
 Li Jiao, chancellor of the Tang Dynasty (d. 713)

Deaths 
 January 17 – Sulpitius the Pious, French bishop and saint
 October 10 – Paulinus, Archbishop of York
 Otto, mayor of the palace (Austrasia) 
 Radulf, king of Thuringia (approximate date)
 Trudpert, Irish missionary (or 607)
 Abu Lu'lu'a Firuz, assassin of Umar I
 Umar I, Muslim caliph
 Valentinus, Byzantine general and usurper

References